Zenisha Moktan is a Nepalese model who won the Miss Nepal beauty pageant in September, 2009.

Controversies
In 2012, Moktan was accused of supporting Nikki Singh, her mother-in-law's sister, a prime suspect in the Disappearance of Chhori Maiya Maharjan. She later made an Instagram post in self-defence, stating that she had no involvement in the case and was dragged into the situation arbitrarily.

References

Nepalese beauty pageant winners
Nepalese female models
Living people
Year of birth missing (living people)
Miss World 2009 delegates
Tamang people